David W. Oliver (December 19, 1819 - February 12, 1905) was the Mayor of Bayonne, New Jersey from 1883 to 1887.

Biography
Oliver was born in Cincinnati, Ohio on December 19, 1819.

Oliver married Mary Warner of Vermont and became involved in real estate. A Democrat, Oliver ran for mayor of Bayonne in 1879 but lost to Republican Stephen K. Lane. Oliver ran successfully against Lane for mayor in 1883. He was re-elected in 1885. After leaving as mayor, Oliver became a member of the Bayonne Board of Adjustment.

He  died on  February 12, 1905 in Jersey City, New Jersey. He was buried in the family plot in Cincinnati, Ohio.

References

1819 births

19th-century Irish people
New Jersey Democrats
Mayors of Bayonne, New Jersey
1905 deaths